The Amtor or Venus series  is a science fantasy series consisting of four novels and one novelette written by American author Edgar Rice Burroughs. Most of the stories were first serialized in Argosy, an American pulp magazine. It is sometimes known as the Carson Napier of Venus series, after its main character, Carson Napier. Napier attempted a solo voyage to Mars, but, because of mistaken navigational calculations, he finds himself heading toward the planet Venus instead. The novels, part of the sword and planet subgenre of science fiction, follow earthman Napier's fantastic adventures after he crash-lands on Venus, called Amtor by its human-like inhabitants. Unlike Barsoom, the desert planet of Mars, these stories are set upon a waterworld like Earth. Most of the events of the series take place on the island of Vepaja, the kingdom of Korva on the island of Anlap, and the city-states of Havatoo and Kormor on the tropical continent north of Vepaja.

As is common in Burroughs's works, the hero is bold and daring, and quickly wins the heart of the Vepajan princess (or janjong) Duare, though class prejudices long inhibit her from expressing her love. Napier meets many varied people, including the Vepajans, refugees from an overthrown empire; the Thorists, thinly disguised communists who ran the Vepajans out of what is now the Thoran empire; pirates; the super-scientific eugenicists of Havatoo; the zombies of Kormor; the fascistic Zanis of Korva; and the hideous Cloud People.

In the course of his adventures within the series, Napier becomes a pirate (twice), escapes from the dread Room of the Seven Doors, and is finally made a prince, or tanjong, of Korva after the overthrow of the Zanis. Napier also rescues princesses from incomparable dangers innumerable times.

Amtorian geography

Amtor is a verdant world shielded from the heat of the Sun by a (nearly) perpetual cloud cover. The portion depicted, largely confined to the southern hemisphere's temperate zone (or Trabol, as it is known to its inhabitants), is primarily oceanic, but includes two continents and a number of large islands.

The main continent is Thora, extending also far into the tropical zone of Strabol and the arctic zone of Karbol—possibly as far as the south pole. The Great and Small Circles correspond to the Antarctic Circle and Tropic of Capricorn on Earth (although Burroughs does erroneously state in the second book, Lost on Venus, that the Small Circle is the equator, and Strabol in the Northern Hemisphere, forgetting that the tropics are on both sides of the equator). Several smaller land masses projecting into Trabol from Karbol appear to be peninsular extensions of Thora; these include Bombaj, Ator, Rovlap, Vodaro, and Vaxlap. Interspersed among these are the great islands of Ganfal, Malpi, Donuk, Movis, Nor, Anlap, Vepaja, Trambol, and Zanbo. The unnamed second continent is a largely tropical landmass north of Vepaja and west of Thora.

Amtorian vegetation, particularly on Vepaja, tends to be gigantic. Vepaja is notable for the enormous forests Napier first encounters upon his arrival, with trees reaching into the inner cloud envelope. Elsewhere, the geography of Amtor is more varied, and he also travels through a dismal pine forest, grassland plains, glacial valleys, and several mountain ranges. Amtorian animals likewise tend to be larger than their Earthly equivalents, and the large species are much more common than they are on Earth, which makes them much more dangerous than Earth fauna and has helped limit exploration of the planet by its natives.

The other impediment to communication, Amtor's quirky cartography, stems from the inhabitants' bizarre cosmology, which at least in the southern hemisphere where Napier lands holds that the world is a flat disc floating on a burning sea of lava, with a rim of ice and a center of fire. As the "rim" is actually the south pole, and the "center" the equator, Amtorians have an extraordinarily distorted, backward view of their planet's surface, and their maps are warped accordingly. Due to the near-perpetual overcast, they have no celestial markers to correct their geographical mismeasurements, let alone on which to base the concepts of a Solar System, other worlds, or the stars. On those rare occasions when the sun does appear through a hole in the clouds, its searing light and heat (twice that on Earth) starts to burn everything; at night, when a hole reveals a few stars, the Amtorians think they are "sparks" from the lava sea supposedly surrounding the planet, and are thus unaware that they are fixed, and have never tried plotting them. All this also means that, unlike Napier, they do not suspect that the northern hemisphere even exists. Napier tries to correct them, but they subscribe to a "theory of relative distance" formulated by one of their scientists, Klufar, and would not accept Napier's correction. The difference between the observed and theoretical versions of geography are reconciled by a pseudo-scientific "Theory of Relativity of Distance", which resolves the problem by multiplying by the square root of minus one. Napier finds it difficult to counter this rationale, noting that "You cannot argue with a man who can multiply by the square root of minus one." Such wry digs are typical of the series. Ironically, Napier finds the simpler Thorans more amenable to his ideas (including believing that he came from another planet) than the more sophisticated Vepajans.

Amtorian culture

Aside from the sophisticated, cultured, and advanced Vepajans that Napier first meets, the human natives of Amtor are generally inhospitable, often trying to murder Napier, kidnap his princess, or both. Their nations are rather loosely connected, partly because the geography is strewn with impassable mountains, impenetrable forests, and unnavigable seas (which Napier nevertheless passes, penetrates, and navigates), and partly because Amtorian maps are inaccurate. In spite of their relative isolation from each other, a worldwide language is current among all people. The level of culture runs the spectrum from savagery to advanced technology; some nations possess a longevity serum, atomic ray guns, and nuclear powered ships. (Burroughs speculated on Element 93 being used for nuclear power, specifically, for RTGs; in reality, certain uranium and plutonium isotopes are used.) Radio is unknown (the ships are reduced to communicating by flags), and there are no native aircraft. In fact, Napier himself designs and builds the first based on Earth technology, which if anything, is an improvement over Earth aircraft in its use of an Amtorian RTG, which enables it to fly silently, hover, and to run almost indefinitely without refueling.

The Amtorian language is described as having a fairly simple agglutinative grammar, enabling Napier to learn it fairly quickly. The plural prefix is kloo- (kl- if the noun begins with a vowel), and the definite article is voo. Napier uses an Anglicized spelling (such as often writing /u/ as oo [the Amtorian u does actually look like a ligature of two Amtorian os, as shown on Burroughs's map of Amtor], or referring to the diphthong /ai/ as "long i"), but describes the vowel system as being simple five-vowel one which renders Amtorians unable to correctly pronounce many English vowels. As with the speakers of many Earth languages, including Spanish, Georgian, or Japanese, and based on the Amtorian placenames and personal names in the story, the vowels appear to simply be /a/, /e/, /i/, /o/, and /u/. Napier does explicitly exclude /ɔ/ and /ɪ/ from the vowel inventory, along with the diphthong /ei/, as he states, "The native Amtorians are unable to pronounce a long A or a short O, and the I is always long". Note that /i/, where it exists, is spelled with an Amtorian e, as in Duare, and possibly with y as well; /ai/, as Napier suggests and as the Amtor maps show, has its own single letter. Punctuation marks are similar to ones on Earth in most respects, although Amtorians also have equivalents to the Spanish inverted marks.

Vepaja: This society is the one Napier first encounters upon landing on the planet. They are described as of being of a medium skin tone, with dark hair and eyes (comparable to Middle Easterners on Earth), and good-looking. They take an anti-aging serum which extends their lifespan indefinitely, so they all appear to be in their 20s or 30s. There are few children; as space in the society is limited, the Vepajans issue just enough permits to their women to have children to replace those Vepajans who get killed or kidnapped. Also, about half of the women are infertile, apparently eventually undergoing menopause despite the anti-aging serum, so the Vepajans actually issue two childbearing permits for every lost Vepajan. However, Venusians appear to under normal conditions live and age about as long as Earth humans do; Princess Duare was 18 when she and Napier first met. The Vepajans were once the elite of a nation that controlled the continent of Thora until the Thorist Revolution, when many were killed and the remainder fled to the isolated island with gigantic trees where they could hide. However, they are still subject to raids and abductions by the Thorists, whose society is decaying due to the lack of intelligent, competent people.

Thora: The former land of the Vepajans, it was taken over by the Thorists and named after Thor, the leader of the Thorist Revolution. Burroughs based Thorism on Communism or Marxism, and Thor based his revolution on overthrowing the elites of Vepaja in a class war and replacing them with his own party's members. High Thorist officials, known as ongyans, are now the elite of Thora. However, due to the fact that the Vepajan elite was more capable at running the country than the Thorists, the Thorists now attempt to kidnap Vepajan men to help keep the infrastructure running, and Vepajan women for eugenic purposes. In addition, as the Thorists have lost knowledge of the Vepajan anti-aging serum, they now once again age and die from disease just like humans on Earth; Vepajan doctors, who are rare in Vepaja itself, are in particular demand. Thorist towns are described as dingy and ugly, with coldly utilitarian buildings, and Thorans are described as being considerably uglier than, and not as intelligent as, the Vepajans. Their internal problems notwithstanding, the Thorists have also established colonies in other places, such as the town of Kapdor on the coast of Noobol, and are the closest thing on Amtor to a world power.

Angans: They are winged humanoids whose faces somewhat bear a resemblance to a bird, with long beaky noses. Those that Napier encounters are also dark-skinned, like Africans on Earth. As they are Thorists, they are often enlisted to capture Vepajans due to their ability to fly. They have hollow bones like Earth birds to reduce their weight, although their bat-like wings are barely strong enough for them to carry one regular human. Normally, to aid mobility, raiding parties are structured so that two angans carry one human.

Nobargans: These are described as brutish humans barely separated from apes, ugly and covered with hair, who live in the country of Noobol (at least). They, or at least their chieftains, are able to speak, and use the same language as the other societies on the planet, although their vocabulary is limited. At least some nobargans are cannibals.

Morov: A country to the west of Noobol, it is ruled by Skor, who is originally from further north in Strabol, but who is at enmity with both his former homeland as well as the Thorans. Unfortunately, Skor is an arrogant mad scientist who captures people and turns them into zombies. Morov's main city is Kormor, on a wide river across from the larger city of Havatoo (which Skor is also at enmity with). All of Skor's own subjects are zombies, although a tribe of hostile pygmies also lives in one area, and a few of Kormor's original living inhabitants also remain in the city, although they are now all elderly. The zombies are capable of speech, and occasionally infiltrate Havatoo by disguising themselves, and if caught, are executed by decapitation and cremation, as they are very difficult to "kill", being already technically dead.

Havatoo: A larger city directly across from Kormor, it is a society that practices eugenics, and is ruled by a five-man council consisting of a biologist, psychologist, chemist, physicist, and soldier, and the classes of Havatoo are built around each of these professions, with the city sectioned accordingly. Like the Vepajans, the Havatooans are good-looking, intelligent, and cultured, and take youth serum, but limit their own lifespans to three hundred years to enable the eugenics to proceed. Napier, who actually failed his own eugenics test but was spared due to his coming from Earth and the useful knowledge he had constructed Venus' first aircraft in Havatoo. Also, to support himself while there, he taught successful, in-demand astronomy classes.

(Note that Burroughs never uses either the term "zombie" or "eugenics" in the books.)

Samary: A tribe that lives down-river from Havatoo in a set of caves. Somewhat like the mythical Amazons, their sex roles are flipped, with the women being larger, stronger, and more aggressive than the men, who have feminine-sounding names. Napier has to rescue Duare from one of their cave villages, Houtomai.

Korva: A kingdom in the land of Anlap, across the sea to the northwest from Vepaja. Its capital is Amlot. The people there are normally sociable, but Carson and Duare arrive there in the midst of a civil war, while a group of revolutionaries known as the Zanis, which had previously seized the capital, are besieging and attacking the city of Sanara. The fascistic Zanis, whose troops are noted for their mohawk haircuts (and whose name is a transparent alteration of Nazi), have a hatred for anyone with ancestry from Ator, another land across the ocean to the southwest of Anlap, because of their large ears.

The stories
Pirates of Venus (1932)
Lost on Venus (1933)
Carson of Venus (1938)
Escape on Venus (1946)
The Wizard of Venus (1964) (novella)

In 2011, the Edgar Rice Burroughs estate commissioned a sixth Amtor novel, Skies of Venus, from writer Neal Romanek, but the novel was never released.

In January 2020 Carson of Venus: The Edge of All Worlds by Matt Betts will be published. Was it ?

Comic books
When DC Comics had the rights to various Burroughs properties, they did an adaptation of Pirates of Venus (in Korak, Son of Tarzan #46–53, partially reprinted in Tarzan Family #60–65) and started an adaptation of Lost on Venus (in Korak #54–56 and Tarzan #230), with art by Michael Kaluta.

Later, Dark Horse Comics obtained the rights of the Burroughs properties, and in 1995 published a four-issue miniseries crossover, Tarzan/Carson of Venus, written by Darko Macan and illustrated by Igor Kordej. It was collected into a trade paperback in 1999.

Feature film
In 2004 an option for the entire Venus series were secured by Angelic Entertainment, Inc. a film production company based in San Diego, California. They have since lost the option rights to this property.  The entire Venus Series property is under option by Jupiter 9 Productions, which is developing the books as a series of features.

References

External links
 The Edgar Rice Burroughs Summary Project
 Angelic Pictures POV Site
 Pirates of Venus Movie Site
 Unravelling Amtor: Following in the Footprints of Matching Mars
 Maps of Amtor
 

 
Book series introduced in 1934
Edgar Rice Burroughs locations
Fantasy novel series
Fiction set on Venus
Fictional elements introduced in 1932
Science fiction book series